Dateline is an Australian television international current affairs program broadcast on SBS.

In 2015 the program changed its format going from one-hour episodes featuring multiple stories, to half-hour single subject episodes. The series focuses on under-reported stories from around the globe, with a documentary style. It is broadcast on Tuesdays at 9.30pm following Insight, and all episodes are available to view on SBS On Demand.

It remains the longest-running international current affairs program in Australia.

History
Since its conception, the Dateline has covered topics such as: global conflict, environmental policies, social justice, crime, women's rights, social change, and global politics. Dateline reporters have covered events including: the Iraq War, violence in East Timor (2006), the war in Afghanistan, global terror attacks, the rise of ISIS, the European refugee crisis, the USA under Trump, Brexit, and pro-democracy protests in Hong Kong – to name a few.

It currently runs for 32 episodes a year.

The long-running current affairs program has also accumulated many awards over its lifetime, including Walkley Awards, Logie Awards, and UNAA Media Peace Awards, New York Festival Awards, an Australian Screen Editors Guild Award, as well as nominations for the One World Media Awards, the Association of International Broadcasting and the Asian Academy Awards.

George Negus hosted the program from 2005 until 2010, replacing journalist Mark Davis, who in his period between 2003 and 2004 gained several nominations for the Walkley Awards.  He was preceded in the host's chair by Jana Wendt and Pria Viswalingam. Negus was replaced by his predecessor Mark Davis and Yalda Hakim, another Dateline journalist. Helen Vatsikopoulos also spent time as host. In December 2012, Yalda Hakim resigned from Dateline to join BBC World News. Yalda was replaced by former CNN presenter Anjali Rao in February 2013.

In 2015 under the new program format the role of studio host was removed. Since then the half-hour episodes have been fronted by a team of award-winning reporters including Evan Williams, Amos Roberts, Catherine Scott, Calliste Weitenberg, Dean Cornish, and guest reporters from within SBS News and Current Affairs such as Marc Fennell, Janice Petersen, Jan Fran and Laura Murphy Oates.

Dateline's executive producers have included: Mike Carey (1999–2007), Peter Charley (2007–2014), and Bernadine Lim (2014–2018). Bernadine Lim left the program in 2018 to become the Head of Documentaries at Screen Australia. Georgina Davies is the current executive producer having been promoted to the role from series producer in 2018.

See also

 List of longest-running Australian television series

References

External links
 Official website

Australian television news shows
Special Broadcasting Service original programming
1984 Australian television series debuts
1990s Australian television series
2000s Australian television series
2010s Australian television series